Rasova, Žabljak, a village in Žabljak Municipality, Montenegro
 Rasova, Constanța, a village and commune in Romania
 Rasova, a village in Bălești, Gorj, Romania
 Rasova (Jaleș), a river in Romania
 , a river in Romania, a tributary of the Danube

See also 
 Rasovo (disambiguation)
 Razová, a village in the Czech Republic